Professor Edward Orton Jr. (October 8, 1863 in Chester, New York, United States – February 10, 1932 in Columbus, Ohio, USA) was an American academic administrator, businessman, ceramic engineer, geologist, and philanthropist.

Early years
Orton Jr. is the son of Dr Edward Orton Sr., a Harvard educated geologist, and Mary Jennings Orton.  Shortly after his birth, in 1865, his family relocated to Yellow Springs, Ohio, when his father became principal of the preparatory school of Antioch College.  In 1873, he began attending public school in Columbus after his father relocated the family when he was appointed first President of The Ohio State Agricultural and Mechanical College.

The Ohio State University
Orton Jr. graduated from Ohio State University with an Engineer of Mines degree in 1884. From 1884 to 1888, he was chemist and superintendent of blast furnaces. The regular manufacture of high silicon alloy of iron, "ferro-silicon," in the United States was introduced first by him, at the Bessie Furnace, New Straitsville, Ohio, 1887–88. In the latter year, he entered the ceramic industries of Ohio, managing several plants until 1893. In 1894, Orton was appointed the first chairman of a school of ceramic engineering at Ohio State University, the first ceramic engineering school in the United States. This school for instruction in the technology of clay, glass and cement industries was established largely through his efforts. Orton also served as the Dean of the College of Engineering from 1902 to 1906 and again from 1910 to 1915.

Orton honored his father with the Orton Memorial Library of Geology, inside Orton Hall at Ohio State University, for perusing the theories and records of earthly change. Orton Hall would later house the Orton Geological Museum.

Military
In 1916, Orton aided in the drafting of the US National Defense Act.  Later that year, during World War I, Orton entered the United States military service.  In 1917, he was commissioned a Major in the Officer's Reserve Corps.  By 1919, he became a Brigadier General in the Quartermaster's Officers Reserve Corp.  On June 2, 1919, he was awarded a Distinguished Service Medal by the United States Congress.

Citizen
Following in his father's footsteps, Orton served as the State Geologist of Ohio from 1899 until 1906.  He purchased, created and donated Camp Mary Orton (named after his first wife) to the Godman Guild of Columbus which operated it as a summer camp and retreat for young mothers and their babies. He was elected President of the Columbus Chamber of Commerce in 1921 and re-elected for a second term in 1922 (only the second citizen to succeed himself). In 1922, he received a Doctor of Science from Rutgers College. In 1931, he received an honorary degree of Doctor of Laws from Alfred University. Later in 1931, he received the professional degree of Ceramic Engineer from The Ohio State University.

American Ceramic Society
Orton served as the first Secretary American Ceramic Society from 1899 to 1917 and later as President during 1930–31.

Standard Pyrometric Cone Company
Orton developed a series of pyrometric cones and established the "Standard Pyrometric Cone Company" to manufacture the cones, which continue to be used. He died in 1932, and in accordance to his Will the Edward Orton Jr. Ceramic Foundation was formed as a charitable trust to operate of the "Standard Pyrometric Cone Company".

Personal
Orton married twice, first to Mary Princess Anderson (1888 until her death in 1927) and later to Mina Althea Orton (1928 until his death in 1932).

Publications 
 Clays of Ohio and the Industries Established Upon Them, in Ohio Geological Survey, v. V, published by The Ohio State University in 1884.
 Ceramics 6 (Clay manufacture — pottery) lectures (April 11 – June 6, 1902) (1902)
 The Progress of the Ceramic Industry (1903)
 with Samuel Vernon Peppel: Limestone Resources & the Lime Industry (1906). .

He also published a number of technical articles and reports in periodicals.

References

External links
Orton information, Department of Geological Sciences, OSU

1863 births
1932 deaths
People from Chester, Orange County, New York
American academic administrators
Engineers from New York (state)
American geologists
Philanthropists from New York (state)
Ohio State University College of Engineering alumni
Ohio State University faculty
Businesspeople from Columbus, Ohio
People from Yellow Springs, Ohio
Ceramic engineering
Engineers from Ohio
Scientists from New York (state)